WBIC is a low power radio station licensed to Wilson, North Carolina. The station's studio is located at Tabernacle Baptist Church and its transmitting facility is located across Airport Boulevard on the campus of Wilson Christian Academy.

History
Tabernacle Baptist Church and its pastor, Joe Shakour, applied for a low power radio station license from the Federal Communications Commission in the fall of 2013 and were awarded a construction permit the following year. The church filed for a license to cover the construction permit on October 14, 2015, and its license was granted on October 19, 2015.

Programming
WBIC airs traditional Christian music. Most songs are in the public domain, and many are hymns. Hourly newscasts are from the Salem Radio Network and forecasts are from staff meteorologist Tom Churchill. In addition, WBIC broadcasts all Tabernacle Baptist Church worship services live.

Select Long Form Programs

 Daily In The Word  is produced by Dr. Paul Chappell, pastor of Lancaster (California) Baptist Church.
 Faith for the Family with Clarence Sexton helps listeners keep God as the Foundation for the Family.
 The Family Altar Program from Lester Roloff is heard in a 15-minute version on weekdays and in its entirety on weekends.
 On Fortress of Faith, Tom Wallace studies Islam and Muslim news from a Christian perspective.
 Prophecy Today is Jimmy DeYoung's weekly Bible study and prophecy Q&A.
 Ranger Bill is a family friendly radio drama from the Moody Radio archive.
 Dr. Bob Shelton presents the Gospel and Bible Prophecy every Sunday.
 Sounds of Joy features time-honored sacred music with host Dave Freeland.
 The Spoken Word of God - The Authorized Bible read by Alexander Scourby.
 Stories of Great Christians - These fifteen-minute radio dramas are from the Moody Radio archive.
 On The Truck Driver's Special, Brother Maze witnesses to "believers from border to border and coast to coast." 
 Unshackled! is a radio drama from Pacific Garden Mission that first aired in 1950 and continues today with new episodes.

References

External links

BIC-LP
BIC-LP